Zhang Yun (born May 1959) is a Chinese economist and banker who served as president of Agricultural Bank of China (ABC) from January 2009 to December 2015. He had also served as vice-president and deputy party chief of the bank. In November 2015 he was taken away by the anti-graft authorities. He spent over 30 years working at the bank and was appointed vice-chairman, president and deputy secretary of the Party committee at the bank in 2009. Zhang Yun is so far the most high-profile bank executive in China caught since Communist Party General Secretary Xi Jinping's continues an anti-graft dragnet at all levels of government, military and ruling Communist Party. His predecessor, Xiang Junbo, was also sacked for graft.

Biography
Zhang was born in May 1959 in Dali County, Shaanxi. He entered Lanzhou University in January 1978, majoring in political economics, where he graduated in January 1982. He also studied at South China Agricultural University and Wuhan University as a part-time student. Beginning in July 1985, he served in several posts in Agricultural Bank of China (ABC), including assistant president of Shenzhen branch of Agricultural Bank of China, vice-president of Guangdong branch of Agricultural Bank of China, and president of Guangxi branch of Agricultural Bank of China. Agricultural Bank of China, one of China's four massive, state-owned banks, is ranked as the world's third-largest bank with $2.7 trillion in assets, according to S&P Global. In March 2001, he was appointed assistant president of Agricultural Bank of China, nine month later, he rose to become vice-president. In January 2009 he was promoted again to become president and deputy party chief of the bank, replacing Xiang Junbo. In November 2015 he was taken away by the authorities under investigation as Communist Party General Secretary Xi Jinping's continues a campaign against corruption at all levels of government. Zhang resigned in the following month.

References

External links

1959 births
People from Weinan
Living people
Lanzhou University alumni
South China Agricultural University alumni
Wuhan University alumni
People's Republic of China economists
Chinese bankers
Agricultural Bank of China people
Economists from Shaanxi
Businesspeople from Shaanxi